The 2011–12 Rain or Shine Elasto Painters season was the sixth season of the franchise in the Philippine Basketball Association (PBA).

Key dates
August 28: The 2011 PBA Draft took place in Robinson's Place Ermita, Manila.

Draft picks

Roster

Philippine Cup

Eliminations

Standings

Bracket

Quarterfinals

Barangay Ginebra-Rain or Shine series

Semifinals

Powerade-Rain or Shine series

Commissioner's Cup

Eliminations

Standings

Governors Cup

Eliminations

Standings

Semifinals

Standings

Finals

Transactions

Pre-season

Trades

Recruited imports

References

Rain or Shine Elasto Painters seasons
Rain or Shine